Brachythoracosepsis is a genus of flies in the family Sepsidae.

Species
Brachythoracosepsis butikensis (Vanschuytbroeck, 1963)
Brachythoracosepsis freidbergi Ozerov, 1996
Brachythoracosepsis nodosa (Walker, 1849)
Brachythoracosepsis pseudonotosa (Ozerov, 1990)
Brachythoracosepsis rossii (Munari, 1982)
Brachythoracosepsis ruanoliensis (Vanschuytbroeck, 1963)
Brachythoracosepsis saothomensis Ozerov, 2000

References

Sepsidae
Diptera of Africa
Sciomyzoidea genera